Prakash Raj is an Indian actor, director, producer, television presenter, and politician. He worked predominantly in Telugu, Tamil, Kannada, Hindi and Malayalam-language films. Prakash Raj is the recipient of many awards and nominations. As of 2021, Prakash Raj has won five National Film Awards, eight Nandi Awards, eight Tamil Nadu State Film Awards, five Filmfare Awards South, four SIIMA Awards, three CineMAA Awards, and three Vijay Awards.

Apsara Film and Television Producers Guild Awards
The Apsara Film & Television Producers Guild Award is presented by the Bollywood film industry to honour and recognize the professional excellence of their peers. Balan has received three awards from four nominations.
32 awards 12 nominations

Filmfare Awards South
The Filmfare Awards South is a segment of Filmfare Awards, which is given to the South Indian film industry, that consists of the Tamil, Telugu, Malayalam and Kannada film industries.

International Indian Film Academy Awards
The International Indian Film Academy Awards are presented annually by the International Indian Film Academy to honour both artistic and technical excellence of professionals in Bollywood, the Hindi language film industry.

International Tamil Film Awards
The International Tamil Film Awards is an awards ceremony that honours excellence in Tamil language films around the world since 2003.

Nandi Awards
The Nandi Awards are the most important awards given for Telugu films. They are given annually by the Government of Andhra Pradesh.

National Film Awards
The National Film Awards, established in 1954, are the most prominent awards for films in India, administered by the Directorate of Film Festivals since 1973.

Santosham Film Awards
The Santosham Film Awards are presented by Santosham film magazine to honour excellence in Telugu films. It has given annually since 2003.

Tamil Nadu State Film Awards
The Tamil Nadu State Film Awards are the most important awards given for Tamil films. They are given annually by the Government of Tamil Nadu. The winners are selected by a jury headed by a chairman.

Vijay Awards
The Vijay Awards are presented by the Tamil television channel STAR Vijay to honour excellence in Tamil cinema. It has given annually since 2006.

Zee Cine Awards
The Zee Cine Awards is an awards ceremony for the Hindi film industry.

CineMAA Awards
The CineMAA Awards are presented annually by the Telugu entertainment channel Maa TV to honour excellence in Telugu films.

South Indian International Movie Awards
The South Indian International Movie Awards or commonly referred as SIIMA are given to honour excellence in the South Indian film industry. The awards are given for Tamil, Telugu, Malayalam and Kannada films.

See also
Prakash Raj
Prakash Raj filmography

References

Lists of awards received by Indian actor